The Truants may refer to:

 The Truants (novel), a 1904 novel by A.E.W. Mason
 The Truants (film), a 1922 film directed by Sinclair Hill